Xiye Bastida Patrick (born 18 April 2002) is a Mexican climate activist and member of the Indigenous Otomi community. She is one of the major organizers of Fridays for Future New York City and has been a leading voice for indigenous and immigrant visibility in climate activism. She is on the administration committee of the People's Climate Movement and a former member of Sunrise Movement and Extinction Rebellion. She cofounded Re-Earth Initiative, an international nonprofit organization that is inclusive and intersectional “just as the climate movement should be.”

Early life

Bastida was born in Atlacomulco, Mexico, to parents Mindahi and Geraldine, who are also environmentalists, and raised in the town of San Pedro Tultepec in Lerma. Her father is of Otomi descent while her Chilean mother has Celtic ancestry. Bastida currently holds dual Mexican and Chilean citizenship.

Bastida and her family moved to New York City after extreme flooding hit their hometown of San Pedro Tultepec in 2015 following three years of drought.

Bastida attended The Beacon School. She enrolled at the University of Pennsylvania in 2020.

Activism 
Bastida began her activism with an environmental club. The club protested at Albany and New York City Hall and lobbied for the Climate and Community Leaders Protection Act (CLCPA) and the Dirty Buildings Bill. It was then she heard about Greta Thunberg and her climate strikes.

Bastida gave a speech on Indigenous Cosmology at the 9th United Nations World Urban Forum, and was awarded the “Spirit of the UN” award in 2018. 

Bastida lead her high school, The Beacon School, in the first major climate strike in New York City on 15 March 2019. She and Alexandria Villaseñor officially greeted Thunberg upon her arrival from Europe by boat in September 2019 to attend the UN Climate Summit. Xiye has been coined "America's Greta Thunberg" however has said that "calling youth activists the ‘Greta Thunberg’ of their country diminishes Greta’s personal experience and individual struggles".

Teen Vogue released a documentary short We Rise on Bastida in December 2019. Bastida has also collaborated with 2040 film to create a short video called Imagine the Future exploring what landscapes and cityscapes could look like in the future.

Bastida contributed to All We Can Save, an anthology of women writing about climate change. She recently spoke at the Leadership Summit on Climate hosted by the Biden Administration, delivering a speech urging world leaders to participate more in climate activism.

While unable to vote in the United States as she is not an American citizen, Bastida indicated support for Massachusetts Senator Elizabeth Warren in the 2020 presidential election, although stressing the bipartisanship of the climate movement.

Filmography
We Rise (2019)
Imagine the future (2020)

References

2002 births
Living people
21st-century indigenous people of the Americas
Climate activists
Indigenous activists of the Americas
Indigenous Mexican women
Indigenous peoples and the environment
Mexican emigrants to the United States
Mexican people of Chilean descent
Mexican people of European descent
Otomi people
People from Atlacomulco
People from Toluca
University of Pennsylvania alumni
Youth climate activists